The World Association of Psychoanalysis (WAP) was launched at the initiative of Jacques-Alain Miller in Buenos Aires on 3 January 1992. It was declared in Paris, four days later, on 7 January. Its statutes are modelled on Jacques Lacan's "Founding Act" and adopt the principles outlined in his "Proposition" on the Pass.

Components 
The World Association of Psychoanalysis groups together the École de la Cause freudienne (France); the Escuela de la Orientación Lacaniana (Argentina); the Escuela Lacaniana de Psicoanálisis del Campo Freudiano (Spain); the Scuola lacaniana di psicoanalisi (Italy); the European Federation of the Schools of the WAP; the Escola Brasileira de Psicanálise (Brazil); the Nueva Escuela Lacaniana (Latin America); and the New Lacanian School.

Lacanian 
With over 2,000 members worldwide, the WAP stands as the largest institutional structure dedicated to the training of psychoanalysts in the Lacanian orientation.

Presidents 
 Jacques-Alain Miller (1992–2002)
 Graciela Brodsky (2002–2006) 
 Éric Laurent (2006–2010)
 Leonardo Gorostiza (2010–2014)
 Miquel Bassols (2014–2018)

International congresses 
In 1994 and 1996, the members of the WAP met in "assemblies". Since 1998, the international meetings have taken the form of congresses.

Preparatory texts for the congresses are published in Scilicet.

References

External links 
 

Psychoanalysis organizations
Jacques Lacan
Organizations established in 1992
1992 establishments in France